Deportivo La Coruña's 1995–96 season included its 31st appearance in La Liga, where it ranked in 9th place. The club also competed in the Copa del Rey, the UEFA Cup Winners' Cup and the Supercopa de España.

Summary

1994–95 had been a great season for Deportivo, as they finished as La Liga runners-up for the second consecutive season and won the Copa del Rey for the first time in their history. However, coach Arsenio Iglesias retired at the end of the season, and was replaced ahead of the new campaign by Welshman John Toshack, formerly of Real Sociedad.

Depor'''s Copa del Rey win qualified them for the 1995 Supercopa de España, and Toshack's reign got off to a great start in the two legged final against Real Madrid. After a goalless first half at Estadio Riazor, Real goalkeeper Francisco Buyo was sent off shortly after the interval, and Donato scored the resulting penalty to give Deportivo the lead. The hosts scored twice more in the next ten minutes, through Fran and Bebeto, to take a commanding lead, and received a late bonus as Mikel Lasa became the second Madrid player to be dismissed. In the second leg at Santiago Bernabéu Stadium, Real captain Fernando Hierro gave them a lifeline in the first half, but Depor struck twice in the last ten minutes via substitutes Javier Manjarín and Txiki Begiristain to earn an emphatic 5–1 aggregate victory.

Another reward for their cup victory the previous year was entry into the 1995–96 UEFA Cup Winners' Cup, and their debut in the competition was a strong one. After beating compatriots and defending champions Real Zaragoza in the quarter-finals, Deportivo faced French side Paris Saint-Germain in the semi-finals. However, a goal in each leg from PSG saw Depor eliminated by the eventual champions.

The season was more troubling domestically. Having finished in the top three in La Liga in each of the previous seasons, Deportivo slipped to ninth in Toshack's first campaign in charge. Their defense of the Copa del Rey crown also ended in the worst possible fashion, as they were eliminated at the first hurdle by Tenerife after a 3–2 aggregate defeat.

Players
Squad
Source:  

Left club during season

Transfers

In

Out

StatisticsLast updated on 17 April 2021.|-
|colspan="14"|Players who have left the club after the start of the season:|}

Competitions
La Liga

League table

Positions by round

Matches

Copa del Rey

UEFA Cup Winners' Cup

First roundDeportivo La Coruña won 8–0 on aggregateSecond roundDeportivo La Coruña won 4–0 on aggregateQuarter-finalsDeportivo La Coruña won 2–1 on aggregateSemi-finalsParis Saint-Germain won 2–0 on aggregate''

Supercopa de España

References

Deportivo de La Coruna
Deportivo de La Coruña seasons